Norbadione A is a pigment found in the bay bolete mushroom (Boletus badius). A polyphenol, norbadione A is related to a family of mushroom pigments known as pulvinic acids. The molecule has also been reported as a potassium salt from the mushrooms Pisolithus tinctorius (horse dung fungus) and Chalciporus piperatus.

Properties
Norbadione A has seven acid-base functional groups, among which are two enolic and two carboxylic acid moieties. These functional groups confer water-solubility to the molecule. It selectively complexes cesium cations (Cs+), with an efficiency comparable to that of some calixarenes or crown ethers. It has been investigated for its ability to provide a protective effect against the damaging effects of ionizing radiation, an effect attributed to its ability to protect DNA-related targets from irradiation. Tests with cell cultures and mice show that although it has some protective effect, it is toxic to cells in higher doses. A diverse array of synthetic derivatives of norbadione A has been created to explore the effect of structure on antioxidant properties and cytotoxicity. A series of alkali chelators based on the structure of norbadione A has been reported. The intramolecular protonation process has been determined. There is a pH-dependent Z to E isomer switch that occurs in both pulvinate moieties, which yields four stereoisomeric forms (E/E, E/Z, Z/Z, Z/E). These stereoisomers may have a widely differing ability to form complexes with Cs+ in solution.

Synthesis
Bourdreux and colleagues reported a total synthesis of norbadione A in 2008. The technique uses a regioselective Diels–Alder reaction and a double Suzuki-Miyaura cross-coupling.

References

Biological pigments
Hispidins